Manshead CE Academy is a mixed Church of England secondary academy and sixth form located on the outskirts of both Caddington and Dunstable in Bedfordshire, England.

The academy (surrounded by countryside and hills) is a member of the Diocese of St Albans Multi-Academy Trust.

The academy is the modern successor to Dunstable Grammar School, which existed from 1881 to 1971 when Bedfordshire adopted the comprehensive education system. From this time, it was an upper school educating pupils aged 13–18, with Ashton Middle School in particular acting as a feeder school to Manshead. However, in September 2014, Manshead became a full secondary school accepting pupils at age 11.

In May 2017, the school converted to a sponsored academy with the Diocese of St Albans Multi-Academy Trust.

The academy is named after the ancient Manshead hundred which covered an area in the south-west of Bedfordshire and included Dunstable.

Notable former pupils
 Kevin McCloud – designer, writer and television presenter
 Tim Robinson – former cricketer and current cricket umpire

Other secondary schools in the area
All Saints Academy
Queensbury Academy
Priory Academy

References

External links
 Manshead School website

Educational institutions established in 1881
1881 establishments in England
Church of England secondary schools in the Diocese of St Albans
Voluntary aided schools in England
Secondary schools in Central Bedfordshire District